Piperidolate is a pharmaceutical drug used to treat the symptoms of gastrointestinal disorders including gastric and duodenal ulcers, gastritis, enteritis, gallstones, cholecystitis, and biliary dyskinesia.  It acts as an antimuscarinic agent.  It was first approved in 1954 and is no longer marketed in the United States.

References

Piperidines
Muscarinic antagonists
Carboxylate esters